"The Gods Were Angry With Me" is a country music song written by Watt Watkins and Roma, sung by Margaret Whiting and Jimmy Wakely, and released on the Capitol label. In February 1950, it reached No. 3 on the country best seller chart. It spent seven weeks on the charts and was the No. 29 juke box country record of 1950.

See also
 Billboard Top Country & Western Records of 1950

References

Jimmy Wakely songs
Margaret Whiting songs
1950 songs